Goblins' Club is the fifty-fourth release and twenty-fourth main studio album by Tangerine Dream. Although sonically a counterweight to The Dream Mixes, it is usually considered the first album in the Millennium/TDI Years era due to the switch from Miramar, despite TDI not yet being the band's label. An Australian version lacked the track "Elf June and the Midnight Patrol," co-written by Linda Spa, replacing it with "Fort Worth Runway One" by Edgar Froese. A 2004 re-release included both, but edited the final two tracks to fit on the disc. Goblins' Club marks the final appearance of Linda Spa as a regular group member until returning for Jeanne d'Arc (2005).

Track listing

Personnel
 Tangerine Dream
 Edgar Froese
 Jerome Froese
 Linda Spa
Guest musicians
 Gerald Gradwohl
 Mark Hornby

Single
"Towards The Evening Star" was released as a promo CD.

Remix
"Towards The Evening Star" was released in 1997 as a two track CD with a remix by The Orb.

References

1996 albums
Sequel Records albums
Tangerine Dream albums